The Southwest Conference baseball tournament was the conference baseball championship of the NCAA Division I Southwest Conference from 1977 through 1996.  The winner of the tournament received an automatic berth to the NCAA Division I Baseball Championship.  Over the course of the event, Texas won 11 of 19 tournaments.

Champions
The following is a list of conference champions and sites listed by year.

Most Valuable Player

See also
Big 12 Conference baseball tournament

References

 
Recurring sporting events established in 1977